Bradley White (born January 15, 1982 in Troy, Ohio) is an American former cyclist. He owns Velo City Cycles, a bike shop.

Major results
2007
6th Prologue Tour of Hainan
2009
1st Stage 7 Tour of the Gila
Most Courageous Rider Stage 3 Tour of California
2011
Most Aggressive Rider Stage 1 USA Pro Cycling Challenge
2014
1st Stage 5 Tour de Langkawi
2015
19th Team Time Trial UCI Road World Championships

References

External links
 
 
 

1982 births
Living people
American male cyclists
Road racing cyclists
Sportspeople from Ohio
People from Troy, Ohio
Cyclists at the UCI Road World Championships